PolyEdit is a compact multipurpose word processor and text editor for Microsoft Windows. It has been developed by PolySoft Solutions since 1998.

The program can be downloaded as PolyEdit Lite, which is free for home use. A paid-for version is also available.

PolyEdit can compress and encrypt documents saved in its native Enhanced Text Format (*.etf), using the Blowfish and SHA-1 algorithms. It can embed OLE objects and images (the latter including PNG files, JPEGs, BMPs, GIFs, and icons). The program supports basic tables and multiple columns, as well as hyperlinks, and features syntax highlighting for C++ and other programming languages. Another feature is PolyEdit's email client, which has a simple address book with an import feature.

Reception
PolyEdit has been criticized by several reviewers for lacking some standard word processing features such as support for footnotes and PDF export.

See also
List of word processors
Comparison of word processors
List of text editors
Comparison of text editors

References

External links
PolyEdit Web Site

Shareware
Windows text editors
Windows word processors
Windows-only shareware
Word processors